King Matt the First is a children's novel by Polish author, physician, and child pedagogue Janusz Korczak. In addition to telling the story of a young king's adventures, it describes many social reforms, particularly targeting children, some of which Korczak enacted in his own orphanage, and is a thinly veiled allegory of contemporary and historical events in Poland. The book has been described as being as popular in Poland as Peter Pan was in the English-speaking world. It was the first of Korczak's novels to be translated into English – several of his pedagogical works have been translated, and more recently his novel Kaytek the Wizard was also published in English.

Plot
Matt is a child prince who is catapulted to the throne by the sudden death of his father.

At the beginning of his reign, Matt enacts several bold reforms aimed at improving life for the people of his kingdom, especially the children, but in spite of his best intentions, reality gets in the way producing many unintended consequences from silly to sinister.

Matt tries to read and answer all his mail by himself and finds that the volume is too much and he needs to rely on secretaries. He is exasperated with his ministers and has them arrested, but soon realizes that he does not know enough to govern by himself, and is forced to release the ministers and institute constitutional monarchy.

When a war breaks out, Matt cannot accept being shut up in his palace, but slips away and joins up, pretending to be a peasant boy - and narrowly avoids becoming a prisoner of war. He takes the offer of a friendly journalist to publish for him a "royal paper" -and finds much later that he gets carefully edited news and that the journalist is covering up the gross corruption of the young king's best friend. Matt tries to organize the children of the entire world to hold processions and demand their rights - and ends up antagonizing other kings. He falls in love with a black African princess and outrages racist opinion (by modern standards, however, Korczak's depiction of blacks is itself not completely free of stereotypes which were current at the time of writing). Finally, he is overthrown by the invasion of three foreign armies and exiled to a desert island.

Sequel 
The story is continued in the sequel, King Matt on a Desert Island, published in the same year and translated into English in 1990. The sequel tells of Matt's personal development in isolation, followed by his eventual return and reestablishment of democracy in his homeland.

Major themes
Korczak often employed the form of the fairy tale in order to prepare his young readers for the dilemmas and difficulties of adult life, and the need to make responsible decisions.

Historical context 
The novel was written at a time of great turmoil and hardship, and comments on contemporary and historical events. Poland, which had not existed as a sovereign nation during the 19th century (the period 1795–1918 – see History of Poland (1795–1918)) had just reemerged from the ashes of World War I. The Second Polish Republic had been formed in 1921, following the Greater Poland Uprising (1918–1919) against Germany, and success in the Polish–Ukrainian War (1918–19) and Polish–Soviet War (1919–21) – see History of Poland (1918–1939). Unemployment was high, and poverty was widespread.

The main Polish political figure of the time was Józef Piłsudski, then the elected leader, who later seized power in a coup in 1926. At the time of the partition of Poland, the last king of Poland was the reformer-king, Stanisław August Poniatowski, who, among other acts, founded Poland's first newspaper, Monitor.

The book also makes references to:

 Partitions of Poland In the book, the three foreign kingdoms are not identified. However, the first kingdom has several harbors and cedes one to Matt, the second is vast and connected with the Orient, and the third is landlocked and friendliest. These accord respectively to Prussia, Russia, and Austria.
 Sejm
 Golden Liberty (widest franchise in Europe at the time)
 Elective monarchy
 szlachta (Polish nobility)
 free election (wolna elekcja).
 Maritime and Colonial League
 Sarmatism
 Polish sabre: Szabla
 Port of Gdynia A significant plot point is the desire for a sea port, which is granted by the first kingdom (i.e. Germany).
 The above is derived from Woodrow Wilson's Fourteen Points for Peace
13. An independent Polish state should be erected which should include the territories inhabited by indisputably Polish populations, which should be assured a free and secure access to the sea, and whose political and economic independence and territorial integrity should be guaranteed by international covenant.
 Gdańsk
 Free City of Danzig
 Polish Corridor

Personal context 
The author's father died in 1896, leaving Korczak, at 18, the head of the family and the sole breadwinner for his mother, sister, and grandmother.

In 1911–1912 Korczak became a director of Dom Sierot, an orphanage of his own design for Jewish children in Warsaw, where he formed a kind of a republic for children with its own small parliament, court and newspaper.

In 1926 Korczak let the children begin their own newspaper, the Mały Przegląd (Little Review), as a weekly attachment to the daily Polish-Jewish newspaper Nasz Przegląd (Our Review).

During the Russo-Japanese War in 1905–1906 he served as a military doctor.

In 1914 Korczak again became a military doctor with the rank of Lieutenant during World War I. During the Polish-Soviet War he served again as a military doctor with the rank of major but was assigned to Warsaw after a brief stint in Łódź.

Like his hero, Korczak went to death with dignity, refusing sanctuary to accompany his young charges to the Treblinka extermination camp in 1942. On their last march through the city of Warsaw, one of the children carried the green flag of King Matt

Cultural diversity 
Matt's friend and love interest is the African princess Klu Klu, who is depicted as a brilliant student and a fierce fighter, and the young King defies prejudice by openly loving her. However, the book reflects stereotypes common at the time in its general depiction of Africans as savage cannibals.

Publication history 

King Matt has been translated into English, Esperanto, German, Hebrew, Italian, Chinese, Japanese, Lithuanian, Latvian, Estonian, Georgian, Ukrainian and Russian, and appeared in various editions, including:
 1922, Warsaw, Poland, Król Maciuś Pierwszy
 1924, Russia (Soviet Union), Ленинград: Сектор «Юный Пролетарий» Рабочего Изд-ва «Прибой», Приключение Короля Матюша, translated by Ю.Н.Райтлер. – 250 с.
 1957, Warsaw, Poland, König Hänschen I., translated by Katja Weintraub
 1958, Warsaw, Poland, Издательство «Полония», Король Матиуш Первый, translated by Муза Константиновна Павлова
 1968, Ukraine (Soviet Union), Київ: видавництво «Веселка», Мацюсеві пригоди, translated by Богдан Чайковський. – 334 с.
 1969, Warsaw, Poland,  Издательство «Полония», Король Матиуш Первый, translated by Муза Константиновна Павлова, 240 pages
 1978, Ukraine (Soviet Union), Київ: видавництво «Веселка», Мацюсеві пригоди, translated by Богдан Чайковський. – 334 с.
 1982, Estonia, Eesti Raamat, Kuningas Maciuś esimene
 1982, Lithuania, Vaga, Karalius Motiejukas Pirmasis
 1986, United States, Farrar, Straus and Giroux, March 1986, hardcover, King Matt the First, translated by Richard Lourie, introduction by Bruno Bettelheim
 1988, United States, The Noonday Press, paperback, January 1988
 1988, Israel, Keter Books, hardcover
 1989, United States, Random House Value Publishing, hardback, January 1989
 1998, United States, Farrar Straus & Giroux, paperback, December 1998
 2004, United States, Algonquin Books, King Matt the First, same translation, paperback, xi+330 pages, introduction by Esmé Raji Codell, cover illustration by Brian Selznick
 2005, United Kingdom, Vintage, King Matt the First, UK edition of 2004 US edition, alternative version of cover, 4 Aug 2005, 352 pages
 2009, Świdnik, Poland, Reĝo Maĉjo la Unua, translated from Polish into Esperanto by Tomasz Chmielik, illustrated by Polish school children, 176 pages
 2010, Russia, Издательство АСТ, Король Матиуш Первый, translated by Наталья Яковлевна Подольская, illustrated by Н. Глушкова, 288 pages, offset
 2011, Russia, Издательство «АСТ, Астрель», Король Матиуш Первый. Антось-волшебник, 825 pages (Король Матиуш Первый pages 5–336, Король Матиуш на необитаемом острове pages 337-578, Антось-волшебник pages 579-825)
 2011, Ukraine, видавництво "А-БА-БА-ГА-ЛА-МА-ГА", Пригоди короля Мацюся translated by Богдан Чайковський and Богдана Матіяш, 534 pages
 2016, Georgia, „ბაკურ სულაკაურის გამომცემლობა“, Lola Kadagishvili, 352 pages
 Polish: Król Maciuś Pierwszy
 English: King Matt the First
 Esperanto: Reĝo Maĉjo la Unua
 German: König Hänschen der Erste
 Japanese: マチウシ一世王
 Estonian: Kuningas Maciuś Esimene
 Latvian: Karalis Matiušs Pirmais
 Lithuanian: Karalius Motiejukas Pirmasis
 Russian: Король Матиуш Первый
 Ukraine: Мацюсеві пригоди

Adaptations 
King Matt has been adapted numerous times, for film, TV, animation, and opera.
 Król Maciuś I – film, Poland, 1958, Wanda Jakubowska
 Król Maciuś I – TV special, Poland, 1997, Filip Zylber

 Le Petit Roi Macius – a Polish-French-German-Hungarian 2 seasons of 26 episodes (10–15 minutes each; sources differ) serial animation, 2002 (other broadcasts 2003–2005); dubbed into English 2006 as "Little King Macius"
 Król Maciuś Pierwszy – animated film, 2007, by the same team as the serial animation
 "King Matt" (Король Матиуш) – opera for children by Lev Konov.  Libretto: Lev Konov (Лев Конов), Olga Zhukova (Ольга Жукова), Ali Ibragimov (Али Ибрагимов). 1988 Moscow, Russian.

See also

 Emperor Tomato Ketchup, 1971 film with similar concept (children ruling the empire)

References

External links 
 Lev Konov - opera "King Matt the First" for/by children. Audio (1992) Part 1 of 6.

1922 novels
Polish novels adapted into films
Novels about orphans
Novels set in Poland
Polish children's novels
20th-century Polish novels
1922 children's books
Novels about royalty